Marino Giovanni Zorzi or Marino Giovanni Giorgi (died 1678) was a Roman Catholic prelate who served as Bishop of Brescia (1644–1678).

Biography
Marino Giovanni Zorzi was born in June 1634 in Venice, Italy and ordained a priest in Dec 1658.
On 9 Jun 1664, he was appointed during the papacy of Pope Alexander VII as Bishop of Brescia.
He served as Bishop of Brescia until his death on 24 Oct 1678 in Brescia, Italy.

See also 
Catholic Church in Italy

References

External links and additional sources
  (for Chronology of Bishops) 
  (for Chronology of Bishops) 

17th-century Roman Catholic bishops in the Republic of Venice
Bishops appointed by Pope Alexander VII
1634 births
1678 deaths